Lee Se-eun (born August 31, 1980) is a South Korean actress. Lee made her acting debut in 1999, then began gaining popularity after starring in the horror film Bunshinsaba (2004). She appears in both television and film, notably Coma (2005), Love Needs a Miracle (2005), Fly High (2007), and The King of Legend (2010).

Personal life 
Lee married in 2015 to a businessman who is three years younger than her. In November 2016, Lee gave birth to her first daughter. In 2021, Lee is pregnant with her second child, expected in late December. 2021  On December 27, 2021, Lee gave birth to a second child.

Filmography

Television drama

Film

Variety show

Theater

Awards and nominations

References

External links
  at C9 Entertainment 

Living people
1980 births
South Korean television actresses
South Korean film actresses
South Korean stage actresses
People from Seoul
Sejong University alumni
South Korean Buddhists